The Good Boss is a 2021 Spanish comedy-drama film directed and written by Fernando León de Aranoa and starring Javier Bardem. A corporate satire, the plot tracks a charismatic and manipulative factory owner meddling in the lives of his employees.

The film received a record-breaking 20 nominations to the 36th Goya Awards, winning 6 (Best Picture, Director, Actor, Original Screenplay, Score and Editing).

Plot
Julio Blanco, the charismatic and manipulative owner of a family-run factory of industrial scales in a Spanish provincial town, meddles in the lives of his employees in an attempt to win an award for business excellence.

Cast

Production
The Good Boss was produced by Reposado PC, The Mediapro Studio and Básculas Blanco AIE, with the participation of RTVE, TV3 and Orange. Filming began in Spain in October 2020 and wrapped in December 2020. It was shot in Móstoles and other locations across the Madrid region.

Release
The film premiered at the 69th San Sebastián International Film Festival on 21 September 2021. Distributed by Tripictures, it was then released theatrically in Spain on 15 October 2021. It became the 4th highest-grossing Spanish film release in the domestic market in 2021 with a revenue of 3,278,021 € and 518,254 viewers in the aforementioned year.

Cohen Media Group acquired US rights to the film. Distributed by Bim, it theatrically released in Italy on 23 December 2021 as Il capo perfetto, whereas, distributed by PRIS Audiovisuais, it opened in Portuguese theatres on 20 January 2022 under the title O Bom Patrão. The film was set for a 28 April 2022 opening in Argentine theatres.

The Good Boss was announced as the opening film of the 39th Miami Film Festival (4 March 2022). A 9 June 2022 release date was set for the film's opening in Chilean theatres, distributed by Star Distribution. It had a limited theatrical release in the United States on 26 August 2022, to be followed by a wider release on 2 September.

Reception
On Rotten Tomatoes the film has an 92% rating based on 105 reviews, with an average rating of 7.4/10. The critics consensus reads: "Led by Javier Bardem's charismatic performance and writer-director Fernando León de Aranoa's sharp humor, The Good Boss is a workplace satire worthy of promotion." On Metacritic, the film holds a weighted average score of 63 out of 100, based on 16 critics, indicating "mixed or average reviews".

Guy Lodge of Variety gave the film a positive review and wrote, "Fernando León de Aranoa's corporate satire is too long and languidly paced to pull off its farcical inclinations, but it gets by on its star's magnetism."

Jordan Mintzer of The Hollywood Reporter also gave the film a positive review and wrote, "Slickly entertaining, considering its rather weighty subject matter..."

Javier Zurro of El Español deemed the film to be the best Aranoa film since the 2002 Mondays in the Sun and the best Spanish comedy in (many) years, a genre dominated for some time now by either family comedies or remakes of international titles, generally lacking in original proposals.

Raquel Hernández Luján of HobbyConsolas gave the film 90 out of 100 points, deeming it "excellent", praising the "sharp script", the (actors') direction, and the "careful mise-en-scène".

Quim Casas of El Periódico de Catalunya considered the film to be "a good tragicomedy of social criticism that could well be the counterpart to Mondays in the Sun".

Jonathan Holland of Screen Daily considered the film to be "slickly-made and entertaining, but ultimately a little déjà vu". Plotwise, he deemed the film to be "as smooth and efficient as a well-run factory".

Mirito Torreiro of Fotogramas gave The Good Boss 4 out of 5 stars, highlighting an immense, eminent Javier Bardem in one of his most dazzling performances to date ("he is, quite simply, the movie"), also considering that Aranoa offers viewers a dark comedy displaying a grim portrayal of labour relations.

Reviewing for Cinemanía, Santiago Alverú gave the film 5 out of 5 stars, writing that the political commitment from León de Aranoa and Javier Bardem mixed with the expressive talent of both of them have created a highly entertaining vindication, concluding that "except for Amancio Ortega, the whole of Spain should like it".

The AACCE selected the film as the Spanish entry for the Best International Feature Film at the 94th Academy Awards over Mediterraneo: The Law of the Sea and Parallel Mothers, and it made the 15-film pre-nomination shortlist in December 2021. It also chose the film as the Spanish submission for Best Ibero-American Film at the 64th Ariel Awards.

Accolades  

|-
| align = "center" rowspan = "3" | 2021 || 13th  || Best Original Screenplay || Fernando León de Aranoa ||  || align = "center" | 
|-
| rowspan = "2" | 27th Forqué Awards || colspan = "2" | Best Fiction or Animation Film ||  || rowspan = "2" | 
|-
| Best Actor (film) || Javier Bardem || 
|-
| align ="center" rowspan ="72" | 2022 || rowspan ="9"| 9th Feroz Awards || colspan ="2" | Best Comedy Film ||  || rowspan="9" | 
|-
| Best Director || Fernando León de Aranoa  || 
|-
| Best Screenplay || Fernando León de Aranoa || 
|-
| Best Actor (film) || Javier Bardem || 
|-
| Best Supporting Actress (film) || Almudena Amor || 
|-
| rowspan="2"|  Best Supporting Actor (film) || Manolo Solo || 
|-
| Celso Bugallo || 
|-
| Best Original Score || Zeltia Montes || 
|-
| Best Trailer || Maurits Malschaert & Mick Aerts || 
|-
| rowspan = "4" | 1st Carmen Awards || Best Supporting Actor || Manolo Solo ||  || rowspan = "4" | 
|-
| Best New Actress || Mara Guil || 
|-
| Best Cinematography || Pau Esteve || 
|-
| Best Costume Design || Fernando García || 
|-
| rowspan = "13" | 77th CEC Medals || colspan = "2" | Best Film ||  || rowspan = "13" | 
|-
| Best Direction || Fernando León de Aranoa || 
|-
| Best Actor || Javier Bardem || 
|-
| rowspan = "2" | Best Supporting Actor || Manolo Solo || 
|-
| Celso Bugallo || 
|-
| Best Supporting Actress || Sonia Almarcha || 
|-
| rowspan = "2" | Best New Actor || Óscar de la Fuente || 
|-
| Tarik Rmili || 
|-
| Best New Actress || Almudena Amor || 
|-
| Best Original Screenplay || Fernando León de Aranoa || 
|-
| Best Cinematography || Pau Esteve Birba || 
|-
| Best Editing || Vanessa Marimbert || 
|-
| Best Score || Zeltia Montes || 
|-
| rowspan ="20"| 36th Goya Awards || colspan ="2" | Best Film ||  || rowspan="20" | 
|-
| Best Director || Fernando León de Aranoa  || 
|-
| Best Actor || Javier Bardem || 
|-
| rowspan="3"| Best Supporting Actor || Fernando Albizu || 
|-
| Celso Bugallo || 
|-
| Manolo Solo || 
|-
|  Best Supporting Actress || Sonia Almarcha || 
|-
| rowspan="2"| Best New Actor || Óscar de la Fuente || 
|-
| Tarik Rmili || 
|-
| Best New Actress || Almudena Amor || 
|-
| Best Original Screenplay || Fernando León de Aranoa || 
|-
| Best Cinematography || Pau Esteve Birba || 
|-
| Best Editing || Vanessa L. Marimbert || 
|-
| Best Art Direction || Cesar Macarrón || 
|-
| Best Production Supervision || Luis Gutiérrez || 
|-
| Best Sound || Iván Marín, Pelayo Gutiérrez, Valeria Arcieri || 
|-
| Best Special Effects || Raúl Romanillos, Míriam Piquer || 
|-
| Best Costume Design || Fernando García || 
|-
|  Best Makeup and Hairstyles || Almudena Fonseca, Manolo García || 
|-
| Best Original Score || Zeltia Montes || 
|-
| rowspan = "8" | 30th Actors and Actresses Union Awards || Best Film Actor in a Leading Role || Javier Bardem ||  || rowspan = "8" | 
|-
| rowspan = "2" | Best Film Actor in a Secondary Role || Óscar de la Fuente || 
|-
| Manolo Solo || 
|-
| Best Film Actress in a Secondary Role || Sonia Almarcha || 
|-
| Best Film Actor in a Minor Role || Fernando Albizu || 
|-
| Best Film Actress in a Minor Role || Mara Guil || 
|-
| Best New Actor || Tarik Rmili || 
|-
| Best New Actress || Almudena Amor || 
|-
| 26th Satellite Awards || colspan = "2" | Best Foreign Language Film ||  || 
|-
| Spanish Screenwriters' Union Awards || Best Screenplay in a Comedy Feature Film || Fernando León de Aranoa ||  || 
|-
| rowspan = "2" | 72nd Fotogramas de Plata || colspan = "2" | Best Spanish Film (according to readers) ||  || rowspan = "2" | 
|-
| Best Film Actor || Javier Bardem || 
|-
| 66th Sant Jordi Awards || Best Spanish Actor || Javier Bardem ||  || 
|-
| rowspan = "11" | 9th Platino Awards || colspan = "2" | Best Ibero-American Film ||  || rowspan = "11" | 
|-
| Best Director || Fernando León de Aranoa || 
|-
| Best Screenplay || Fernando León de Aranoa || 
|-
| Best Original Score || Zeltia Montes || 
|-
| Best Actor || Javier Bardem || 
|-
| Best Supporting Actress || Almudena Amor || 
|-
| Best Supporting Actor || Manolo Solo || 
|-
| Best Editing || Vanessa Marimbert || 
|-
| Best Cinematography || Pau Esteve || 
|-
| Best Sound || Valeria Arcieri ||  
|-
| Best Art Direction || César Macarrón || 
|-
| 64th Ariel Awards || colspan = "2" | Best Ibero-American Film ||  || 
|-
| 35th European Film Awards || colspan = "2" | Best European Comedy ||  || 
|}

See also
 List of Spanish films of 2021
 List of submissions to the 94th Academy Awards for Best International Feature Film
 List of Spanish submissions for the Academy Award for Best International Feature Film

References

External links
 
 
 The Good Boss at ICAA's Catálogo de Cinespañol

2021 films
2021 comedy-drama films
Spanish black comedy films
Spanish comedy-drama films
Films set in factories
Films set in Spain
Films shot in the Community of Madrid
Films directed by Fernando León de Aranoa
Workplace comedy films
2020s Spanish-language films
Films distributed by Disney
2020s Spanish films
Best Film Goya Award winners